Landing Stripling is a 1962 Tom and Jerry animated short film, released on May 18, 1962. It was the sixth of the thirteen cartoons in the series to be directed by Gene Deitch and produced by William L. Snyder in Czechoslovakia.

Plot
Tom and Jerry are sleeping outside during the day when a yellow bird wearing a red helmet lands on Tom, waking him up. Although the bird brushes Tom's torso off and reacts politely like "pardon me", the easily-annoyed Tom goes after the bird, catches it, and proceeds to beat it up. Jerry wakes up hearing this and goes after Tom by tying a string to his tail, throwing the string over a tree then tying the other end to a telephone pole. After this, he cuts the pole and tips it enough to lift Tom up into the tree. The bird and Jerry then fill a large tub with water, put it on an outside fireplace, light a fire underneath, then the bird loosens the string and lets Tom sling-shot into the tub, where he splashes around yelling, jumps out and bounces away and back (with funny "boing boing" sounds). The bird and Jerry laugh at the fact Tom looks bottomless. Tom grabs the hose and chases Jerry and the bird into the mouse hole, and tries flooding them out, as Tom laughs and laughs himself silly, but Jerry and the bird stop the hose with a mousetrap until the water backs up enough and the bird comes out and pops the hose, leaving Tom tied up in the hose. Tom then tries catching the bird on an electrical wire and almost electrocutes himself, then falls off into a wheelbarrow and into a shed, where he gets an idea. He turns himself into some kind of bird then climbs a tree, but before he could take off, Jerry brings an electric oscillating fan over, turns it on, and Tom loses his balance, falls off and bounces away. Next, Tom returns to the house with a box saying DANGER!. We find out it's a cannon, and while he is trying to take aim at the bird, Jerry sneaks down, drills a hole in the missile, then ties Tom's tail in it, so when he fires the missile, he is taken with it into a tree. Finally, in the most memorable scene, Tom takes all the grass around the outdoor fireplace, sets it in there and sets it on fire, causing smoke to just about blanket the sky. Afterwards, he grabs a lawnmower and mows a strip in the field, then lines the strip with Christmas lights, illuminates them, then waits at the end of the strip with his mouth open. However, instead of the bird, a jet airliner comes down and picks Tom up by his mouth. After the plane flies over the tree Jerry and the bird are in, Tom lands on the same branch that they're on. The closing theme is played and the bird then slaps a sticker saying "VIA AIR MAIL" on his forehead, kisses him, then salutes him, while Tom wearily returns the salute. The same sky background as the opening credits but with the inscription "THE END AN MGM CARTOON" is shown as the bird chirps one final time.

References

External links

1961 animated films
Animated films about birds
Films directed by Gene Deitch
Tom and Jerry short films
1960s American animated films
1961 comedy films
Animated films without speech
1961 films
1961 short films
Metro-Goldwyn-Mayer short films
Metro-Goldwyn-Mayer animated short films
American comedy films
Rembrandt Films short films
1960s English-language films